Thomas James Jones (born 1876) was an English footballer who played in the Football League for Stoke.

Career
Jones was born in Newcastle-Under-Lyme and played for local amateur clubs Newcastle Swifts and Congleton Hornets before joining Stoke in November 1898. He took the place at inside-forward and it took him until the final three matches of the 1899–1900 season before he found the back of the net scoring five goals. He was moved to outside left for the 1900–01 season but lost his place in January 1901 to Len Benbow and decided to leave for Crewe Alexandra.

Career statistics
Source:

References

English footballers
Crewe Alexandra F.C. players
Stoke City F.C. players
English Football League players
1876 births
Year of death missing
Sportspeople from Newcastle-under-Lyme
Association football inside forwards